Alena Vasileŭna Amialiusik (born 6 February 1989) is a Belarusian road bicycle racer, who rides for UCI Women's WorldTeam .

She competed at the 2012 Summer Olympics in the Women's road race, finishing 15th. She was announced as a member of the  squad for the 2015 season. She also competed in the 2015 European Games for Belarus, in cycling, more specifically, the women's road race and earned a gold medal. At the World Championships in Richmond, she also won a gold medal on the team time trial with her team . In November 2015 she was announced as part of the  team's inaugural squad for the 2016 season.  At the 2016 Olympics, she competed in both the road race and the time trial.

Major results
Source:

2006
 7th Road race, UCI Junior World Championships
2007
 UEC European Junior Road Championships
3rd  Time trial
9th Road race
 National Road Championships
3rd Time trial
3rd Road race
2008
 4th Team pursuit, UCI Track Cycling World Championships
 UEC European Under-23 Track Championships
6th Scratch
9th Points race
2009
 3rd Time trial, National Road Championships
 7th Road race, UEC European Under-23 Road Championships
2010
 2nd Road race, National Road Championships
 2nd Team pursuit, National Track Championships
2011
 National Road Championships
1st  Time trial
1st  Road race
 UEC European Under-23 Road Championships
2nd  Road race
7th Time trial
 National Track Championships
3rd Points race
3rd Scratch
 4th Overall Puchar Prezesa LZS
2012
 National Road Championships
1st  Time trial
3rd Road race
 1st Stage 1 (ITT) La Route de France
 2nd Overall Tour Féminin en Limousin
 3rd Grand Prix GSB
 4th Overall Emakumeen Euskal Bira
 5th Overall Gracia–Orlová
1st Mountains classification
1st Sprints classification
 5th GP Comune di Cornaredo
 6th Durango-Durango Emakumeen Saria
 8th Overall Vuelta a El Salvador
 9th Grand Prix el Salvador
 10th Tour of Flanders
2013
 National Road Championships
1st  Time trial
1st  Road race
 1st GP Oberbaselbiet
 1st Stage 2 (ITT) Tour Cycliste Féminin International de l'Ardèche
 2nd Overall Vuelta a El Salvador
1st Stage 2 (TTT)
 2nd Grand Prix GSB
 3rd Overall Tour Languedoc Roussillon
1st Mountains classification
 4th GP de Plouay
 5th Overall La Route de France
 5th Overall Gracia–Orlová
1st  Mountains classification
1st  Sprints classification
 6th Overall Emakumeen Euskal Bira
 6th Grand Prix de Dottignies
 7th La Flèche Wallonne Féminine
 8th Grand Prix el Salvador
 9th Grand Prix de Oriente
 9th Durango-Durango Emakumeen Saria
 10th Overall Giro d'Italia Femminile
2014
 National Road Championships
1st  Time trial
1st  Road race
 1st Grand Prix el Salvador
 2nd Overall Vuelta a El Salvador
1st  Points classification
1st  Mountains classification
1st Stages 1 & 2
 2nd Overall La Route de France
 2nd Grand Prix GSB
 3rd  Team time trial, UCI Road World Championships
 3rd Overall Vuelta Internacional Femenina a Costa Rica
1st  Mountains classification
1st Stage 3
 3rd Trofeo Alfredo Binda-Comune di Cittiglio
 4th Philadelphia Cycling Classic
 5th Overall Tour Cycliste Féminin International de l'Ardèche
1st Stage 5
 5th Nagrada Ljubljane TT
 6th Grand Prix de Oriente
 6th Giro dell'Emilia Internazionale Donne Elite
 9th GP de Plouay
2015
 UCI Road World Championships
1st  Team time trial
8th Time trial
8th Road race
 European Games
1st  Road race
8th Time trial
 National Road Championships
1st  Time trial
1st  Road race
 1st  Overall Gracia–Orlová
1st  Points classification
1st  Mountains classification
1st  Active rider classification
1st Stage 1
 1st Winston-Salem Cycling Classic
 1st  Mountains classification Holland Ladies Tour
 1st Stage 2a (TTT) Energiewacht Tour
 2nd Crescent Women World Cup Vårgårda TTT
 3rd Philadelphia Cycling Classic
 5th Overall Tour of California
 5th Trofeo Alfredo Binda-Comune di Cittiglio
 6th Tour of Flanders for Women
 6th Chrono Gatineau
 7th Strade Bianche Women
 9th La Flèche Wallonne Féminine
2016
 UCI Road World Championships
2nd  Team time trial
10th Time trial
 2nd Time trial, National Road Championships
 3rd Overall Gracia–Orlová
1st  Points classification
1st Stage 1
 3rd Overall Holland Ladies Tour
 3rd Philadelphia Cycling Classic
 3rd Giro dell'Emilia Internazionale Donne Elite
 UEC European Road Championships
4th Road race
4th Time trial
 5th Trofeo Alfredo Binda-Comune di Cittiglio
 6th La Flèche Wallonne Féminine
 9th Overall Giro d'Italia Femminile
 10th GP de Plouay – Bretagne
2017
 2nd Grand Prix de Plumelec-Morbihan Dames
 2nd La Classique Morbihan
 8th Overall Tour of California
2018
 1st  Team time trial, UCI Road World Championships
 National Road Championships
1st  Road race
1st  Time trial
 3rd Overall Women's Tour de Yorkshire
 5th Trofeo Alfredo Binda-Comune di Cittiglio
2019
 1st Stage 1 (TTT) Giro Rosa
 National Road Championships
2nd Time trial
3rd Road race
 2nd Postnord UCI WWT Vårgårda West Sweden TTT
 5th Time trial, European Games
 8th Liège–Bastogne–Liège
 9th Time trial, UCI Road World Championships
 10th Giro dell'Emilia Internazionale Donne Elite
2020
 6th Tour of Flanders for Women
 8th Time trial, UEC European Road Championships
2021
 5th Overall Belgium Tour
1st Stage 2
 8th Road race, UEC European Road Championships
 10th Time trial, UCI Road World Championships
2022
  Combativity award Stage 3 Tour de France

References

External links
 
 
 
 
 
 
 

1989 births
Living people
Belarusian female cyclists
Olympic cyclists of Belarus
Cyclists at the 2012 Summer Olympics
Cyclists at the 2016 Summer Olympics
Cyclists at the 2020 Summer Olympics
European Games gold medalists for Belarus
European Games medalists in cycling
Cyclists at the 2015 European Games
Cyclists at the 2019 European Games
People from Babruysk
Sportspeople from Mogilev Region